Seal Lake, also known as Sael Lake, Saelso, Saelsöen and Sælsø, is a land-locked freshwater fjord in southern King Frederick VIII Land, in Greenland's northeastern coast. The lake and its surroundings are part of the Northeast Greenland National Park zone.

The Seal Lake was named by the Denmark expedition to East Greenland 1906–1908. It was named after a seal which expedition members allegedly had seen swimming in it. Captain Alf Trolle reported, however, that the original name had been Store Sø (Big Lake) or Lakse Sø (Salmon Lake).

Geography
Seal Lake is a lake with a fjord structure. It is located in the Germania Land peninsula to the north of the Mørkefjord. A short river discharges its waters in the northern shores of the Dove Bay of the Greenland Sea.

See also
List of fjords of Greenland

References

External links 
Investigations of ice-free sites for aircraft landings in east Greenland
Lakes of Greenland
Fjords of Greenland